Roger Wellington Tubby (December 30, 1910 – January 14, 1991) was the seventh White House Press Secretary from 1952 to 1953 and served under President Harry Truman. From 1945 to 1948, he served as the spokesperson of the United States Department of State.

Career
Roger Tubby born in Greenwich, Connecticut, in 1910 and went to Yale University. He worked in Bennington, Vermont, for the Bennington Banner; Tubby was a reporter and then editor. His main achievement there was getting town manager government for Bennington.

During the war, he was in the Board of Economic Warfare and when that became the Foreign Economic Administration, a combination of BEW and Lend-Lease, he became assistant to the administrator, Leo Crowley. Subsequently, he went to the Department of Commerce as Director of Information of the Office of International Trade; and after that to the Department of State in 1946 with Mike [Michael J.] McDermott, who was then the chief spokesman of the Department of State and had been for a great many years before.

In 1950, he went to the White House as the assistant White House press secretary under Joseph Short. In 1953, John Foster Dulles asked him to come back to the State Department and be his Press Chief. Subsequently, in partnership with Jim [James] Loeb bought the Adirondack Daily Enterprise, the Adirondack Park's only daily newspaper based in Saranac Lake, where he was co-publisher-editor, jack-of-all-trades, and became president of the Adirondack Park Association, an association that covers all the communities of about a fifth of New York State, in the northeast corner; and advisor to the Governor on natural resources and conservation. For a short time, he worked with Averell Harriman when he was Governor.

In 1956, he went out to campaign with the Adlai Stevenson staff, and in 1960 joined John F. Kennedy at the Los Angeles convention and stayed with the Kennedy team through the election, serving as Director of Press Relations for the Democratic National Committee.

He later became Assistant Secretary of State for Public Affairs; and for the last seven and one half years he was Representative of the United States to the European Office of the United Nations in Geneva, 1962–69.  Tubby was Dean of the School of Professional Studies, Foreign Service Institute, Department of State.

Notes

External links

 Roger Wellington Tubby papers (MS 508). Manuscripts and Archives, Yale University Library. 

Roger Tubby

|-

|-

1910 births
1991 deaths
20th-century American non-fiction writers
American reporters and correspondents
People from Greenwich, Connecticut
Truman administration personnel
United States Department of State spokespeople
White House Press Secretaries
Yale University alumni
United States Assistant Secretaries of State